Tyler John Alexander (born July 14, 1994) is an American professional baseball pitcher for the Detroit Tigers of Major League Baseball (MLB). He made his MLB debut in 2019.

Amateur career
Alexander attended Carroll Senior High School in Southlake, Texas. In 2013, as a senior, he went 12–1 with a 0.66 ERA, striking out 177 batters in 94.2 innings. He was drafted by the Detroit Tigers in the 23rd round of the 2013 MLB draft, but did not sign with the Tigers and instead chose to attend Texas Christian University (TCU), where he played college baseball. As a freshman in 2014, he went 10–3 with a 2.36 ERA in twenty games (16 starts), and in 2015, as a sophomore, he went 6–3 with a 3.07 ERA in 17 games (15 starts). After his sophomore season, Alexander was again drafted by the Tigers, this time in the second round of the 2015 MLB draft.

Professional career
Alexander signed with the Tigers and spent the 2015 season with the Connecticut Tigers, posting an 0–2 record and 0.97 ERA in 37 innings pitched. He started 2016 with the Lakeland Flying Tigers and was promoted to the Erie SeaWolves during the season. In 25 total games (24 starts) between the two teams, he pitched to an 8–8 record and 2.44 ERA with a 1.05 WHIP. He returned to Erie in 2017, posting an 8–9 record, a 5.07 ERA, and 120 strikeouts in 27 games (26 starts), and in 2018, he played for both Erie and the Toledo Mud Hens, going 6–8 with a 4.44 ERA in 26 games (24 starts).

2019
Alexander returned to Toledo to begin the 2019 season. On July 3, 2019, the Tigers selected Alexander's contract and promoted him to the major leagues as the 26th man of a doubleheader against the Chicago White Sox. In his major league debut, he pitched five innings, allowing two runs and recording four strikeouts (including the very first batter he faced). On September 16, Alexander pitched six innings of one-run baseball against the Baltimore Orioles, earning his first major league win.

2020
On August 2, 2020, against the Cincinnati Reds, Alexander set an MLB record for a reliever by striking out nine consecutive batters. He also tied the American League and Tigers' franchise record of nine consecutive strikeouts set by Doug Fister on September 27, 2012. He became the first pitcher with 10 or more strikeouts in a relief outing since Randy Johnson set the strikeout record for a relief pitcher with 16 on July 18, 2001. (Johnson's record was accomplished on the second day of a suspended game; while he was the first pitcher to appear that day, he was officially listed as a reliever.)

With the 2020 Detroit Tigers, Alexander appeared in 14 games, compiling a 2–3 record with a 3.96 ERA and 34 strikeouts in  innings pitched.

2021
Alexander made the Tigers opening day roster out of 2021 spring training. He began the season as a long reliever and occasional "opener" (pitching the first two to three innings of a game), before being moved to an official starting role in July.  On August 20, Alexander pitched a career-high seven innings and allowed only one run against the Toronto Blue Jays to record his first quality start of the season. Overall in 2021, Alexander appeared in 41 games (15 starts), posting a 2–4 record and 3.81 ERA, while striking out 87 batters in  innings.

2022
Alexander made the Tigers opening day roster out of 2022 spring training. He suffered a left elbow sprain and was placed on Detroit's 15-day IL on May 2, retroactive to April 30. He was recalled to the Tigers on June 14. On September 19, Alexander took a no-hitter into the seventh inning against the Baltimore Orioles before surrendering a leadoff single to Ryan Mountcastle. Alexander ended up throwing seven shutout innings as he and the Tigers won 11–0. On November 18, Alexander signed a one-year, $1.875 million contract with the Tigers, avoiding arbitration.

Pitch selection
Alexander throws a combination of four-seam and two-seam fastballs. The four-seam fastball averages 91 MPH (topping out at 94 MPH). He initially threw his two-seam fastball as a sinker at 90 to 91 MPH, but opponents were hitting it for an average over .360. In 2021, Alexander began throwing his two-seamer as a cutter at an average of 87 MPH (topping out at 90 MPH). This pitch has been much more effective, with opponents hitting it at only a .222 clip that season. Alexander's main offspeed pitches are a changeup at about 84 MPH and a slider averaging 85 MPH.

References

External links

TCU Horned Frogs bio

Living people
1994 births
Baseball players from Chicago
Major League Baseball pitchers
Detroit Tigers players
TCU Horned Frogs baseball players
Connecticut Tigers players
Lakeland Flying Tigers players
Erie SeaWolves players
Toledo Mud Hens players